András Schäfer (born 13 April 1999) is a Hungarian professional footballer who plays as a left midfielder for Bundesliga club Union Berlin and the Hungary national team.

Club career
Schäfer made his Hungarian League debut for MTK appearing as a substitute away at against Gyirmót on 1 April 2017.

On 17 January 2020, he joined Dunajská Streda, playing in the Fortuna Liga on loan until the end of the 2019–20 season, with an option to purchase.

Union Berlin

On 21 January 2022, Schäfer joined Union Berlin in the Bundesliga.

On 7 May 2022, Schäfer scored his first goal in the Bundesliga on the 33rd game week of the 2021–22 Bundesliga season in a 4–1 away victory against SC Freiburg at the Europa-Park Stadion, Freiburg im Breisgau. In the 2021–22 Bundesliga season he earned 8 caps and scored 1 goal.

International career
Schäfer made his debut with the Hungary national team in a 1–0 UEFA Nations League win over Turkey on 3 September 2020.

On 1 June 2021, he was included in the final 26-man squad to represent Hungary at the rescheduled UEFA Euro 2020 tournament. He scored his first international goal on 4 June 2021, in a 1–0 win against Cyprus.

Career statistics

Club

International

References

External links
 
 
 

Living people
1999 births
Hungarian people of German descent
Sportspeople from Szombathely
Hungarian footballers
Hungary international footballers
Hungary under-21 international footballers
Hungary youth international footballers
Association football midfielders
MTK Budapest FC players
Genoa C.F.C. players
A.C. ChievoVerona players
FC DAC 1904 Dunajská Streda players
1. FC Union Berlin players
Nemzeti Bajnokság I players
Nemzeti Bajnokság II players
Slovak Super Liga players
Bundesliga players
UEFA Euro 2020 players
Hungarian expatriate footballers
Hungarian expatriate sportspeople in Italy
Expatriate footballers in Italy
Hungarian expatriate sportspeople in Slovakia
Expatriate footballers in Slovakia
Hungarian expatriate sportspeople in Germany
Expatriate footballers in Germany